Old Town Municipal Airport and Seaplane Base , also known as Dewitt Field, is a public use airport located two nautical miles (4 km) northwest of the central business district of Old Town, in Penobscot County, Maine, United States. It is owned by the City of Old Town. The seaplane base is located on Marsh Island on the Penobscot River.

Facilities and aircraft 
It has two asphalt paved runways: 12/30 measuring 3,999 x 100 ft (1,219 x 30 m) and 4/22 measuring: 3,199 x 75 ft (975 x 23 m). It also has one seaplane landing area (17W/35W) measuring 8,400 x 100 ft (2,560 x 30 m).

For the 12-month period ending July 31, 2006, the airport had 47,160 aircraft operations, an average of 129 per day: 99% general aviation and 1% military. At that time there were 51 aircraft based at this airport: 80% single-engine, 8% multi-engine, 10% helicopter and 2% ultralight.

References

External links 

Seaplane bases in the United States
Buildings and structures in Old Town, Maine
Airports in Penobscot County, Maine